Sum of Parts is the third studio album from electronic artist Eon.

Track listing

References

2002 albums
Eon (musician) albums